Bucket List is a 2018 Indian Marathi language comedy drama  film directed by Tejas Prabha Vijay Deoskar. Jointly produced by DAR Motion Pictures, Dark Horse Cinemas and Blue Mustang Creations, the film stars Madhuri Dixit in her Marathi debut, along with Renuka Shahane and Sumeet Raghavan. Dixit released the first poster of the film on 14 January, it was followed by a 43-second long teaser on 25 March 2018. It was released on 25 May 2018.

On 29 November 2018, Dixit announced the streaming of the film on Netflix through her Instagram Account.

Plot 
The film begins with dedicated housewife Madhura (Madhuri Dixit) cooking a custom-made meal for each of her family members (husband Mohan (Sumeet Raghavan), daughter, son, in-laws and grandmother-in-law). She is clearly shown to have dedicated her entire existence towards keeping her family happy, from sunrise to sunset. It is revealed that Madhura received a heart transplant a few months ago, and she traces the donor to a 20-year-old girl called Sai. Madhura feels obliged to show her gratitude and visits Sai's parents (played by Renuka Shahane and Milind Phatak) and her twin brother, Salil (Sumedh Mudgalkar) at their home.

Sai's family is caught off-guard, but receives her amicably, except for Salil. She discovers that Sai had voluntarily signed up to be an organ donor, and encouraged her friends to do so too (Sai's cause of death is shown as truck accident through newspaper). Madhura is touched and inspired by the young girl's profound thoughts. She decides to attend Sai's college reunion which Sai had planned to go to, and learns more about Sai from her friends there. She discovers that Sai had a 'bucket list' - a list of things she intended to complete before her 21st birthday, but died before being able to do so. Madhura immediately decides to fulfill Sai's wishes by completing the list itself. What begins as a heart-warming journey of Harley motorbike races and disco nights evolves into a whole new voyage of self-rediscovery for Madhura.

Cast

 Madhuri Dixit as Madhura Sane
 Sumeet Raghavan as Mohan Sane
 Vandana Gupte as Aai (Madhura's mother-in-law)
 Pradeep Velankar as Baba (Madhura's father-in-law)
 Shubha Khote as Panji
 Dilip Prabhavalkar as Madhura's father
 Ila Bhate as Madhura's mother
 Renuka Shahane as Mrs. Deshpande (Sai's mother)
 Milind Phatak as Mr. Deshpande (Sai's father)
 Sumedh Mudgalkar as Salil Deshpande (Sai's twin brother)
 Krutika Deo as Riya
 Resham Tipnis as Lavina Mavera	
 Shalv Kinjawadekar as Adi
 Ritika Shrotri as Radhika Sane
 Atharva Bedekar as Neil Sane
 Ranbir Kapoor (Cameo Appearance)
Shishir Sharma as surgeon in hospital (special appearance)

Soundtrack

The soundtrack of Bucket List consists of three songs composed by Rohan-Rohan the lyrics of which have been written by Mandar Cholkar and Tejas Prabha Vijay Deoskar.

Reception

Box office
Bucket List was released in 409 screens in India and opened to pretty decent collections at box office. It collected   on the opening day. Bucket List saw a decent growth on its second day, collecting   and third day  .

The film saw a considerable decrease over the weekdays and collected .

Critical response

Mihir Bhanage of The Times of India said that the film doesn't have anything more to offer than what the trailer had already revealed but praised the performance of Madhuri Dixit saying that, "Madhuri owns the film and sails through it with flying colours." and gave the film a rating of 3 out of 5. Kunal Guha of Mumbai Mirror gave the film a rating of 2.5 out of 5 saying that, "Madhuri Dixit long-overdue debut in Marathi cinema is a comfort watch even if a tad predictable and sappy." Kennith Rosario of The Hindu reviewed the film saying that, "Though a well-intentioned film, Bucket List is repetitive and often hammers its message to a point of sheer boredom." Johnson Thomas of Free Press Journal gave the film a rating of 3 out of 5 and said that, "The narrative is more interested in presenting the diva in sparkling form than in telling a plausible story. So it’s entirely Madhuri’s show, so-to-speak!". Snehil Sharma of Humaribaat online portal gave 4 out of 5, he further explains "Overall film is joyful  and entertaining in all respect".

Prasanna D Zore of Rediff said that, "Madhuri's Bucket List isn't as endearing as her" and gave the film a rating of 2.5 out of 5. Devansh Sharma of First Post gave the film a rating of 3 out of 5 and praised Madhuri Dixit's performance but found the screenplay of the film to be weak specially in the second half of the film. Suhani Singh of India Today praised the funny moments of the film and the acting performances of Madhuri Dixit and Shubha Khote but criticized the "holier-than-thou image" of Madhura [the character played by Madhuri Dixit] as it wasn't quite believable. Suhani gave the film a rating of 2 out of 5. Abhay Salvi of Marathi Stars gave the film a rating of 2.5 out of 5 saying that, "Bucket List’s biggest problem is the directorial decision making, from the tone of the film to the overall flow of the screenplay, the inclusion of irrelevant drama & the absurd climax."

See also
 The Bucket List, a 2007 American comedy drama film

References

External links

2010s Marathi-language films
2018 comedy-drama films
Films set in hospitals
Indian comedy-drama films
Films about organ transplantation
Films scored by Rohan-Rohan